Where the Sidewalk Ends is a 1950 American film noir directed and produced by Otto Preminger. The screenplay for the film was written by Ben Hecht, and adapted by Robert E. Kent, Frank P. Rosenberg, and Victor Trivas. The screenplay and adaptations were based on the novel Night Cry by William L. Stuart. The film stars Dana Andrews and Gene Tierney.

Andrews plays Mark Dixon, a ruthless and cynical metropolitan police detective who despises all criminals because his father was one. Considered a classic of the genre, the film displays a brand of violence "lurking below urban society" considered an important noir motif.

Plot
Mark Dixon is a police detective who was just demoted over his too-frequent use of violence. Because his own father was a criminal, he hates them even more than is acceptable to the force.

At a floating crap game in New York City run by gangster Tommy Scalise, the beautiful Morgan Taylor decides to leave for the night, with or without the man, Ken Paine, who brought her there.  Effusive Texas tycoon Morrison offers to escort her home. This upsets Scalise, as Morrison is up $19,000 on his bank. Morrison says he is in town all week and "you'll get it back another night," but Paine tells Morgan she has to stay. She realizes he only brought her to the game so Morrison would follow, and is now determined to leave.

Paine slaps Morgan, whereupon Morrison starts a fistfight with Paine. Morrison is knocked out, but when the police arrive he has been stabbed to death. Dixon is one of the officers on the scene. He interrogates Scalise, whom he arrested two years earlier for murder but who was acquitted.

Scalise tells several lies about the crime, and implicates Paine. Dixon goes to Paine's apartment and questions him, but Paine becomes angry and starts a fight. Defending himself, Dixon does not know that a war injury has left Paine with a metal plate in his skull. When Paine falls, he hits his head and dies.

After his recent reprimand, Dixon does not dare report what has happened. Borrowing Paine's coat and putting a bandage on his own face where Paine had one, he lays a false trail suggesting that Paine has left town. Back at Paine's apartment he is almost seen by Morgan's father, cab driver Jiggs Taylor, who arrives and (having found out that Paine had slapped his daughter) noisily threatens him from outside his door, then leaves when there is no answer. Dixon then takes the body and dumps it in the river. It is soon found and, moving to cover himself, Dixon suggests that Scalise murdered Paine as well as Morrison.

As the case develops the detectives talk to Morgan and Jiggs Taylor. It is revealed that Morgan is Paine's estranged wife; the night of the murder is the first time she has seen him in months. She and Dixon begin to fall in love. In spite of Dixon's insisting that Scalise is the killer, Jiggs had been seen at Paine's apartment and is arrested. Dixon cannot bear to tell Morgan the truth, but he arranges to pay for a top lawyer for Jiggs, one who has never lost a murder case. For unspecified reasons the lawyer refuses a retainer.

After a fruitless confrontation with Scalise, Dixon writes a letter, addressing the envelope to Inspector Foley and marking it "to be opened in the event of my death." He then arranges to meet with Scalise again, fully expecting to be murdered but reasoning that at least this time Scalise will be held responsible. Scalise has anticipated this, too, and has realized what happened to Paine. He refuses to kill Dixon, who is shot in his arm instead. Then one of Scalise's men arrives with the news that the police have gotten the truth about Morrison out of another gang member. As the gang attempts escape in a car elevator, Dixon manages to delay them by stalling it until the police arrive.

Back at the 16th Precinct, Foley - extremely proud of Dixon's work trapping Scalise - returns Dixon's letter to him, unopened, but Dixon tells him to read it. Foley arrests Dixon. Morgan is present, looking forward to starting a life with Dixon. Perplexed, she asks why he is now being taken into custody; Dixon asks Foley to show her the letter. Even knowing the truth her love for Dixon is undaunted. She confidently declares that he will not be punished for the accidental death.

Cast
 Dana Andrews as Det. Mark Dixon
 Gene Tierney as Morgan Taylor
 Gary Merrill as Tommy Scalise
 Bert Freed as Det. Paul Klein 
 Tom Tully as Jiggs Taylor
 Karl Malden as Lt. Thomas
 Ruth Donnelly as Martha
 Craig Stevens as Ken Paine
 Neville Brand as Steve (uncredited)
 Harry von Zell as Mr. Morrison (uncredited)
 Oleg Cassini as Oleg (uncredited)

Background
Where the Sidewalk Ends is the last film that Otto Preminger would make as a director-for-hire for Twentieth Century Fox in the 1940s. The series includes Laura, which also stars Gene Tierney and Dana Andrews, Whirlpool (starring Tierney), as well as Fallen Angel and Daisy Kenyon (both starring Andrews).

Where the Sidewalk Ends was primarily shot on a studio set, but the filmmakers also shot a few scenes at actual New York City locations.

Reception

Critical response
Most critics compare the film unfavorably to Preminger's earlier film Laura, which used much of the same talent. According to film writers, this film, a grittier noir, does succeed in showing a darker side of police similar to the film noirs that follow it.

The New York Times film critic, Bosley Crowther, while thinking the script was too far-fetched, liked the way the dialogue was written, and the acting as well. He wrote, "...the plausibility of the script by Ben Hecht, an old hand with station houses and sleazy underworldlings, is open to question on several counts. Not so, however, his pungent dialogue and unfolding of the plot, which Otto Preminger, who guided the same stars through Laura several seasons back, has taken to like a duck to water and kept clipping along crisply till the fadeout."

The staff at Variety magazine praised the direction of the film. They wrote, "Otto Preminger, director, does an excellent job of pacing the story and of building sympathy for Andrews." Harrison's Reports called the film "one of the most taut and absorbing crime melodramas produced in many a moon," with "exceptionally good" dialogue. John McCarten of The New Yorker, however, only deemed it to be "a fair-to-middling-melodrama."

Preservation
The Academy Film Archive preserved Where the Sidewalk Ends in 2004.

References

External links

Streaming audio
 Where the Sidewalk Ends "Night Cry", radio adaptation of original source material for Suspense show—1948

1950 films
1950 crime drama films
1950s thriller films
20th Century Fox films
American black-and-white films
Fictional portrayals of the New York City Police Department
Films about the New York City Police Department
Film noir
Films based on American novels
Films directed by Otto Preminger
Films scored by Cyril J. Mockridge
Films set in New York City
Films shot in New York City
American police detective films
American crime drama films
Films with screenplays by Ben Hecht
1950s English-language films
1950s American films